Toy Bolton (November 22, 1926 – June 8, 2001) was a NASCAR Grand National Series driver and team owner from Gastonia, North Carolina, US.

Career
He competed in just four races in his two-year NASCAR career. His first race was the 1964 Textile 250 while his last race was the 1966 Columbia 200. While Bolton never cracked the top ten in championship points, his best season was the 1966 season where he finished 81st in season points.

Bolton's sponsor was himself; stating that he was a driver/owner during his entire career. His highest earnings for a race were $530 ($ when adjusted for inflation). This amount of money was gained at the March 13, 1966 race at Rockingham Speedway.

Motorsports career results

NASCAR
(key) (Bold – Pole position awarded by qualifying time. Italics – Pole position earned by points standings or practice time. * – Most laps led.)

Grand National Series

References

External links
 
 

NASCAR drivers
NASCAR team owners
People from Gastonia, North Carolina
Racing drivers from North Carolina
1926 births
2001 deaths